Let's Explore Diabetes With Owls is a collection of narrative essays by David Sedaris. The book was released on April 23, 2013. It debuted at the Number One Spot on the New York Times Bestseller List. Sedaris has said the title was one he had considered for his previous book, Squirrel Seeks Chipmunk and was inspired by a fan's suggestion that he inscribe a book with a message along the lines of "explore your inner feelings: "I never write what people ask me so I said, 'I’ll keep the word explore' and I wrote, 'let’s explore diabetes with owls.' "

Essays

References

External links

2013 non-fiction books
American essay collections
Works by David Sedaris
Little, Brown and Company books